A Onda Mortal / Uma Tarde com PJ is a self-released EP by CSS, released in January 2005. It contains demos of songs launched in the previous CD-Rs, mash-ups and covers of Blondie, The Undertones, Madonna, Eurythmics, Disk Putas and Supla. A highlight is "I Wanna Be Your J.Lo", featured in two versions and which blends a comedy-rap intro by Lovefoxxx, the lyrics from the chorus of Jennifer Lopez's "Jenny from the Block" and the main riff of Sleater-Kinney's "I Wanna Be Your Joey Ramone".

Track listing
"Meeting Paris Hilton" (band version) (Adriano Cintra/Lovefoxxx)
"Sô Lora, Sô Burra" (Disk Putas)
"Hollywood" (Madonna/Mirwais Ahmadzaï)
"Bezzi (versão gay) vs. Sweet Dreams" (Adriano Cintra/Luiza Sá/Lovefoxxx/Annie Lennox/David Stewart)
"One Way or Another vs. Teenage Kicks" (Deborah Harry/Nigel Harrison/John O'Neill)
"I Wanna Be Your J.Lo (Missy Elliott vs. Yeah Yeah Yeahs)" (Adriano Cintra/Lovefoxxx/Sleater-Kinney/Jean Claude "Poke" Olivier/Samuel Barnes/Jennifer Lopez/Troy Oliver/Mr. Deyo/Lawrence Parker/Simon Sterlin/Jose Fernando Arbex Miro)
"I Wanna Be Your J.Lo (Sleater-Kinney vs. J.Lo)" (Adriano Cintra/Lovefoxxx/Sleater-Kinney/Jean Claude "Poke" Olivier/Samuel Barnes/Jennifer Lopez/Troy Oliver/Mr. Deyo/Lawrence Parker/Simon Sterlin/Jose Fernando Arbex Miro)
"Ódio, Ódio, Ódio, Sorry C." (band version) (Adriano Cintra/Lovefoxxx)
"Humanos (Tokyo)" (Supla/BiD/Andrés Etchenique)
"Madonna Dos Infernos (Hollywood)" (Madonna/Mirwais Ahmadzaï)

Personnel
Lovefoxxx: vocals, artwork
Adriano Cintra: drums, producer, guitar, keyboards, programming
Ana Rezende: guitar
Luiza Sá: guitar
Iracema Trevisan: bass
Maria Helena Zerba: keyboards
Clara Ribeiro: vocals

CSS (band) EPs
2005 EPs
Self-released EPs